Étaing is a commune in the Pas-de-Calais department in the Hauts-de-France region of France.

Geography
The A26 autoroute passes by about half a mile from the village.

Population

Places of interest
 The church of Notre-Dame, rebuilt, as was the rest of the village, after World War I.

See also
Communes of the Pas-de-Calais department

References

Communes of Pas-de-Calais
French Flanders